Abdullah El-Sawy (Arabic عبدالله الصاوي; born October 26, 1971), is an Egyptian former football striker. He was the top scorer of Egyptian Premier League (1994–95) with 10 goals playing for El Qanah.

International career

After being the top goal scorer, El-Sawy made some appearances for the Egypt national football team, including 1996 African Cup of Nations qualification qualifying matches.

International Goals
Scores and results list Egypt's goal tally first.

Titles and honours
 Top scorer in Egyptian Premier League (1994–95) with 10 goals.

References

External links
 
 

1971 births
Living people
Egyptian footballers
Egypt international footballers
Association football forwards
People from Tanta